The Bulldog Marching Band is the marching band for Samford University located in Homewood, Alabama. The band supports all Bulldogs athletic teams and performs at all football home games. Students from all academic disciplines can participate in the band.

References

External links
Bulldog Marching Band - Band website

Samford University
Southern Conference marching bands
College marching bands in the United States